The Orășa is a left tributary of the river Tazlău, in Romania. It flows into the Tazlău near Livezi.

References

Rivers of Romania
Rivers of Bacău County